The Old Man and the Sea is a novella written by the American author Ernest Hemingway in 1951 in Cayo Blanco (Cuba), and published in 1952. It was the last major work of fiction written by Hemingway that was published during his lifetime. One of his most famous works, it tells the story of Santiago, an aging Cuban fisherman who struggles with a giant marlin far out in the Gulf Stream off the coast of Cuba.

In 1953, The Old Man and the Sea was awarded the Pulitzer Prize for Fiction, and it was cited by the Nobel Committee as contributing to their awarding of the Nobel Prize in Literature to Hemingway in 1954.

Plot summary
Santiago is an aging, experienced fisherman who has gone eighty-four days without catching a fish. He is now seen as "salao" (colloquial pronunciation of "salado", which means salty), the worst form of unlucky. Manolin, a young man whom Santiago has trained since childhood, has been forced by his parents to work on a luckier boat. Manolin remains dedicated to Santiago, visiting his shack each night, hauling his fishing gear, preparing food, and talking about American baseball and Santiago's favorite player, Joe DiMaggio. Santiago says that tomorrow, he will venture far out into the Gulf Stream, north of Cuba in the Straits of Florida to fish, confident that his unlucky streak is near its end.

On the eighty-fifth day of his unlucky streak, Santiago takes his skiff out early. By noon, he has hooked a big fish that he is sure is a marlin, but he is unable to haul it in. He is unwilling to tie the line to the boat for fear that a sudden jerk from the fish would break the line. With his back, shoulders, and hands, he holds the line for two days and nights. He gives slack as needed while the marlin pulls him far from land. During this time, he subsists on flying fish, bonito and a dolphinfish, using his other hooks to catch them. The line cuts his hands, his body is sore, and he sleeps little. Despite this, he expresses compassion and appreciation for the marlin, often referring to him as a brother. He determines that no one is worthy enough to eat the marlin.

On the third day, the fatigued marlin begins to circle the skiff. Santiago, almost delirious, draws the line inward, bringing the marlin towards the boat.  He pulls the marlin onto its side and stabs it with a harpoon, killing it.  Seeing that the fish is too large to fit in the skiff, Santiago lashes it to the side of his boat.  He sets sail for home, thinking of the high price the fish will bring him at the market and how many people he will feed.

The trail of blood from the dead marlin attracts sharks.  Santiago berates himself for having gone out too far.  A great mako shark ambushes them and tears a large wound into the marlin before Santiago kills it with his harpoon, but loses the weapon to the dead shark. He makes a spear by strapping his knife to the end of an oar.  He kills three more sharks before the blade of the knife snaps, and he clubs two more sharks into submission.  But each shark has bitten the great marlin, increasing the flow of blood.  That night, an entire school of sharks arrives.  Santiago attempts to beat them back.  When the oar breaks, Santiago rips out the skiff's tiller and continues fighting.  Upon seeing a shark attempt to eat the marlin's head, Santiago realizes the fish has been completely devoured. He tells the sharks they have killed his dreams.

Santiago reaches shore before dawn the next day. He struggles to his shack, leaving the fish head and skeleton with his skiff. Once home, he falls into a deep sleep. In the morning, Manolin finds Santiago. As he leaves to get coffee for Santiago, he cries. A group of fishermen have gathered around the remains of the marlin. The fishermen tell Manolin to tell Santiago how sorry they are. A pair of tourists at a nearby café mistake the dead fish for a shark. When Santiago wakes, he donates the head of the fish to Pedrico, a fellow fisherman who has long been kind to Santiago. He and Manolin promise to fish together once again. Santiago returns to sleep, and he dreams of his youth and of lions on an African beach.

Background and publication

Written in 1951, The Old Man and the Sea is Hemingway's final work published during his lifetime. The book, dedicated to Charlie Scribner and to Hemingway's literary editor Max Perkins, was simultaneously published in book formfeaturing a cover illustration by his young muse, Adriana Ivancich, and black and white illustrations by Charles Tunnicliffe and Raymond Sheppardand featured in Life magazine on September 1, 1952. The first edition print run of the book was 50,000 copies and five million copies of the magazine were sold in two days.

The Old Man and the Sea became a Book of the Month Club selection, and made Hemingway a celebrity. In May 1953, the novella received the Pulitzer Prize and was specifically cited when in 1954 he was awarded the Nobel Prize in Literature which he dedicated to the Cuban people. The success of The Old Man and the Sea made Hemingway an international celebrity. The Old Man and the Sea is taught at schools around the world and continues to earn foreign royalties.

Literary significance and criticism
The Old Man and the Sea served to reinvigorate Hemingway's literary reputation and was greeted with relief by some critics who had been dismayed by his last full-length novel Across the River and into the Trees and believed Hemingway was a spent force. The novella was initially received with much popularity; it restored many readers' confidence in Hemingway's capability as an author. Its publisher, Scribner's, on an early dust jacket, called the novella a "new classic", and many critics favorably compared it with such works as William Faulkner's 1942 short story "The Bear" and Herman Melville's 1851 novel Moby-Dick.

Several critics note that Santiago hails from the Canary Islands, and that his Spanish origins have an influence in the novella. “Santiago is a Spaniard living in Cuba,” Jeffrey Herlihy comments, and his “Spanish self is an absent but ever-present factor in the novel.” After immigrating to Cuba in his 20s, he has adopted Cuban dress, food preferences, and “speaks two dialects of the Spanish language.” Every night Santiago dreams about Spain, and this “nostalgic reminiscing—which is for the Canary Islands, not Cuba—evidences the resonant influences of his Spanish/Canarian identity, foregrounding the migrant experience of the old man as a concealed foundation to the novella”.  His biography has many similarities to that of Gregorio Fuentes, Hemingway's first mate.

Gregorio Fuentes, who many critics believe was an inspiration for Santiago, was a blue-eyed man born on Lanzarote in the Canary Islands. After going to sea at age ten on ships that called in African ports, he migrated permanently to Cuba when he was 22. After 82 years in Cuba, Fuentes attempted to reclaim his Spanish citizenship in 2001. Critics have noted that Santiago was also at least 22 when he immigrated from Spain to Cuba, and thus old enough to be considered an immigrant—and a foreigner—in Cuba.

Hemingway at first planned to use Santiago's story, which became The Old Man and the Sea, as part of an intimacy between mother and son. Relationships in the book relate to the Bible, which he referred to as "The Sea Book". Some aspects of it appeared in the posthumously published Islands in the Stream (1970). Hemingway mentions the real-life experience of an old fisherman similar to Santiago and his marlin in On the Blue Water: A Gulf Stream Letter (Esquire, April 1936).

Joseph Waldmeir's 1957 essay "Confiteor Hominem: Ernest Hemingway's Religion of Man" is a favorable critical reading of the novel—and one which has influenced later analysis. Waldmeir's says of the book's message:
The answer assumes a third level on which The Old Man and the Sea must be read—as a sort of allegorical commentary on all his previous work, by means of which it may be established that the religious overtones of The Old Man and the Sea are not peculiar to that book among Hemingway's works, and that Hemingway has finally taken the decisive step in elevating what might be called his philosophy of Manhood to the level of a religion.

Waldmeir considered the function of the novel's Christian imagery, most notably through Hemingway's reference to the crucifixion of Christ following Santiago's sighting of the sharks that reads:

"Ay," he said aloud. There is no translation for this word and perhaps it is just a noise such as a man might make, involuntarily, feeling the nail go through his hands and into the wood.

One of the most outspoken critics of The Old Man and the Sea is Robert P. Weeks. His 1962 piece "Fakery in The Old Man and the Sea" presents his argument that the novel is a weak and unexpected divergence from the typical, realistic Hemingway (referring to the rest of Hemingway's body of work as "earlier glories"). In juxtaposing this novel against Hemingway's previous works, Weeks contends:
The difference, however, in the effectiveness with which Hemingway employs this characteristic device in his best work and in The Old Man and the Sea is illuminating. The work of fiction in which Hemingway devoted the most attention to natural objects, The Old Man and the Sea, is pieced out with an extraordinary quantity of fakery, extraordinary because one would expect to find no inexactness, no romanticizing of natural objects in a writer who loathed W. H. Hudson, could not read Thoreau, deplored Melville's rhetoric in Moby Dick, and who was himself criticized by other writers, notably Faulkner, for his devotion to the facts and his unwillingness to 'invent.'

Medal gifted to the Blessed Virgin Mary
In 1954, Hemingway gifted his Nobel Prize in Literature medal as an “ex Voto” to the venerated image of the Blessed Virgin Mary titled as Our Lady of Charity in El Cobre, Cuba. The golden medal was stolen in 1986, and was swiftly recovered within a few days upon the direct threat of Raul Castro who vigorously demanded its return. 

For a decade, the ornament was not worn by the Marian image, having returned on display during  the Apostolic Visit of Pope John Paul II during a second canonical coronation in 24 January 1998. The medal is stored within the secured treasury chamber of the Minor Basilica of El Cobre, and is rarely worn on special and solemn occasions.

Legacy
The Old Man and the Sea has been adapted for the screen three times: a 1958 film starring Spencer Tracy, a 1990 miniseries starring Anthony Quinn, and a 1999 animated short film. In 2007, an audio version performed by Donald Sutherland was a finalist for the Audie Award for Best Male Narrator. It also inspired the 2012 Kazakhstani movie The Old Man, which replaces the fisherman with a shepherd struggling to protect his flock from wolves. It is often taught in high schools as a part of the U.S. literature curriculum. The book was reportedly a favorite of Saddam Hussein.

In 2003, the book was listed at number 173 on the BBC's The Big Read poll of the UK's 200 "best-loved novels".

Notes

References

Sources

Further reading

External links
 
 Rare, Unseen: Hemingway in Cuba—slideshow by Life magazine
 

1952 American novels
American novels adapted into films
American novels adapted into television shows
Angling literature
Books by Ernest Hemingway
Charles Scribner's Sons books
Fish in popular culture
Modernist novels
Nautical novels
Novels about animals
Novels by Ernest Hemingway
Novels set in Havana
Novels set in the Caribbean
Pulitzer Prize for Fiction-winning works
Works about old age